Miguel Nicolás Bertocchi (born 9 June 1989) is an Argentine professional footballer who plays as a central midfielder for Gimnasia Jujuy.

Career
Bertocchi began with San Lorenzo. He was promoted into their senior squad during the 2009–10 Argentine Primera División season, making the first of three appearances on 28 March 2010 versus Arsenal de Sarandí - his career debut. Two seasons later, Bertocchi was loaned to Primera B Nacional's Aldosivi. Seven appearances followed with the club. He returned to San Lorenzo for 2012–13 and appeared on the bench four times, but failed to feature. He subsequently joined Unión Santa Fe of the Argentine Primera División on loan in August 2013. He netted two goals in his eighth game, against Defensa y Justicia.

Overall, Bertocchi scored five times in thirty-one fixtures for Unión Santa Fe. Defensa y Justicia became Bertocchi's fourth club on 30 June 2014. He remained for the 2014 and 2015 seasons, scoring twice versus Atlético de Rafaela and Gimnasia y Esgrima respectively. In the following two campaigns, Bertocchi played for fellow Primera División team Patronato. On 30 August 2017, Bertocchi joined Argentine Primera División side Tigre. He had to wait until January 2018 for his debut, during a home loss to Banfield at the Estadio José Dellagiovanna. Bertocchi officially departed Tigre in the succeeding months.

In February 2018, Bertocchi made a move to Sweden to join Dalkurd FF of the Allsvenskan. However, the club claimed to have pulled out of the signing but Bertocchi declared all parties signed a contract. He subsequently took the club to court in the following April, with a final decision not being made until September 2019. Two months later, in June 2018, Bertocchi agreed to join Chilean Primera División team Deportes Temuco. After ten total matches for Temuco, Bertocchi made a return to Argentina with San Martín on 4 June 2019.

Career statistics
.

References

External links

1989 births
Living people
People from Rosario Department
Argentine footballers
Association football midfielders
Argentine expatriate footballers
Expatriate footballers in Chile
Argentine expatriate sportspeople in Chile
Argentine Primera División players
Primera Nacional players
Chilean Primera División players
San Lorenzo de Almagro footballers
Aldosivi footballers
Unión de Santa Fe footballers
Defensa y Justicia footballers
Club Atlético Patronato footballers
Club Atlético Tigre footballers
Deportes Temuco footballers
San Martín de San Juan footballers
Central Norte players
Gimnasia y Esgrima de Jujuy footballers
Sportspeople from Santa Fe Province